La Voix du Sahel (English: "Voice of the Sahel") is the national radio station of Niger, owned by the Nigerien government, operating on 91.3MHZ. Based in Niamey, the radio station was established in 1958 as Radio Niger but adopted its current name in 1974. It is the only national radio station in the country and is the only radio station to offer programs in eight different languages including French.

See also
 Media of Niger

References
Afdevinfo

Radio stations in Niger
Mass media in Niamey
1958 establishments in Niger
Radio stations established in 1958